Attila Ara-Kovács (born 14 January 1953) is a Hungarian politician, philosopher and journalist. He was nominated to the fourth place in the Democratic Coalition's European Parliament list. Subsequently, he was elected a Member of the European Parliament for Hungary in the 2019 election.

References

1953 births
Living people
MEPs for Hungary 2019–2024
Democratic Coalition (Hungary) MEPs